Rudolf Dittrich (12 February 1903 – 1990) was a German Kammersänger.

Life 
Dittrich was born in Prositz, today a district of Stauchitz. Born into a farming family in the Riesa area and raised with hard farm work in  near Dresden, Dittrich is said to have shown his musical talent at an early age. In 1923, he successfully passed his examination and found employment in the school service. The training school, praised for its musical character as well as visits to the Dresden Semperoper, especially the performances of Smetana's The Bartered Bride with Richard Tauber, reinforced his desire to sing, which is why he tested his voice with the help of Czech baritone Hans Pokorny.

On New Year's Eve 1928, he auditioned for the Heldentenor of the Dresden State Opera, Kurt Taucher (i.e. Curt Taucher). Visibly impressed, the latter arranged an audition with Generalmusikdirektor Fritz Busch. He had prepared the cavatina from Gounod's Faust. Busch, who was already in tails because he was about to perform the "Palm Sunday Ninth" (in which Dittrich himself would later be responsible for the tenor role), quickly put a stop to it, because the first notes already convinced him, he merely had his impression confirmed by intoning the High C.

In the middle of the 1928/29 season, namely in March 1929, the  entered the opera business, despite the fact that his salary was not paid until 1 April. The pedagogue working in a closed classroom thus became, via the intermediate station of lyric tenor, a heroic tenor on the wide stage of the Dresden State Opera, which was equipped with a theatre ensemble of world reputation, consisting of Marta Fuchs, Friedrich Plaschke, Ivar Andresen, Kurt Böhme, Paul Schöffler, Max Lorenz, Erna Berger and now Rudolf Dittrich. He began with small parts such as the First Prisoner in Fidelio (1929) and came across Max in Der Freischütz (1930) and Don José in Carmen to the great parts of the youthful heroic fach. Later he was entrusted with the great parts of Wagner's operas, so at Easter time 1932 for the first time Parsifal. Contemporary operas were as close to his heart as the immortal classics. He sang in Machinist Hopkins, in Münchhausen and in 1940 in Sutermeister's Romeo and Juliet alongside Maria Cebotari and directed by Karl Böhm. Despite everything, his favourite piece remained the tenor solo in Beethoven's Symphony No. 9. He often performed it outside Dresden under famous conductors such as Furtwängler, Knappertsbusch, Clemens Krauss and Willem Mengelberg. He already experienced a special ennoblement in the inaugural year 1929 by Richard Strauss, who had chosen him for his performances of his own works Salome and Die ägyptische Helena. Dittrich gave guest performances in Berlin, Hamburg, Vienna, Munich, Barcelona and Geneva, to name only the most famous opera cities.

In the 1940s, an overdose of a drug led to damage to his vocal cords, as a result of which he had to slowly take his leave of the opera stage. In 1948, he only sang Narraboth in the Salome performance in the makeshift Kulturscheune Bühlau and Tamino in the first Mozart production in the newly created Kleines Haus. By then his repertoire totalled 76 roles. Generalintendant Martin Hellberg appointed the incapacitated opera star as performance master, voice teacher and opera consultant in 1949, he owes his specialisation in promoting young talent from 1954 onwards to general music director Franz Konwitschny and opera director Alfred Eichhorn. In the mid-1950s he also became Répétiteur.

His loyalty to his hometown was also expressed in the fact that instead of following appointments to Vienna or Munich he preferred to co-found the workers' opera  Dresden-Niedersedlitz and served as its advisor. In his old age, the man appointed honorary member of the Dresden State Opera in 1967 never missed a premiere, and if he had anything to criticise or suggest beyond mere interest, he always found grateful open ears.

Grateful for their good education were Theo Adam (his pupil from 1946 to 1949), with whom he subsequently formed a friendship, Gerhard Stolze, Wilfried Krug, Nelly Ailakowa and many others.

Dittrich died in Buehlau, Dresden and found his final resting place at the Bühlauer Friedhof.

Notes

References

External links 
 
 

German operatic tenors
1903 births
1990 deaths
People from Meissen (district)
20th-century German male opera singers